Wola Mysłowska  is a village in Łuków County, Lublin Voivodeship, in eastern Poland. It is the seat of the gmina (administrative district) called Gmina Wola Mysłowska.

The village has a population of 330.

References

Villages in Łuków County
Lublin Voivodeship (1474–1795)
Siedlce Governorate
Lublin Governorate
Lublin Voivodeship (1919–1939)